Sin Jun-Bae  (born 26 October 1985) is a South Korean former footballer who played as goalkeeper.

He was arrested on the charge connected with the match fixing allegations on 29 May 2011. On 17 June 2011, his football career was rescinded by the Korea Professional Football League with other accomplices.

References

External links 

1985 births
Living people
Association football goalkeepers
South Korean footballers
Daejeon Hana Citizen FC players
K League 1 players
Sportspeople from Gwangju
Sportspeople banned for life